Soan Papdi is a 2015 Tamil language comedy crime thriller film written and directed by debutant Sivani and produced by S. Kalaivani under Golden Movie Maker. The film features Sri of Vazhakku Enn 18/9 fame, child actor Sahil (making his debut), Priya, and Niranjana in lead roles, while Manobala and Pattimandram Raja play supporting roles. The music was composed by Dhanraj Manickam with cinematography by Thanu Balaji and editing by K. Thanigachalam. The film released on 29 May 2015.

Plot 
The story is about an engineer who lands in a mysterious quandary and how he begins to unravel the mystery around it.

Cast 
 Sri as Shiva
 Sahil as Sahil
 Priya as Aarthy
 Niranjana
 Manobala 
 Pattimandram Raja
 Besant Ravi

Soundtrack

The soundtrack album for Soan Papdi was composed by Dhanraj Manickam. The lyrics penned by Na. Muthukumar, Annamalai, and S. Kalaivani. The audio was released by director Karthik Subbaraj and actress Aishwarya Rajesh. This is the first film album that features Gana Bala's first duet song.

Release
The Times of India gave the film a rating of one-half out of five stars and wrote that "This might seem like a decent plot on paper, but an air of amateurishness pervades Soan Papdi that it is hard for us to not mind the poor writing or the ineffectual filmmaking." A critic from The New Indian Express felt that the film was better skipped.

References

External links
 

2010s Tamil-language films